
Gmina Płońsk is a rural gmina (administrative district) in Płońsk County, Masovian Voivodeship, in east-central Poland. Its seat is the town of Płońsk, although the town is not part of the territory of the gmina.

Villages
Gmina Płońsk contains the villages and settlements of Arcelin, Bogusławice, Bońki, Brody, Cempkowo, Cholewy, Cieciórki, Ćwiklin, Ćwiklinek, Dalanówko, Ilinko, Ilino, Jeżewo, Kluczewo, Kownaty, Koziminy-Stachowo, Krępica, Lisewo, Michalinek, Michowo, Młyńsk, Nowe Koziminy, Pilitowo, Poczernin, Pruszyn, Raźniewo, Siedlin, Skarzyn, Skrzynki, Słoszewo, Słoszewo-Kolonia, Stare Koziminy, Strachówko, Strachowo, Strubiny, Szeromin, Szerominek, Szpondowo, Szymaki, Woźniki, Wroninko and Zawady.

Neighbouring gminas
Gmina Płońsk is bordered by the town of Płońsk and by the gminas of Baboszewo, Dzierzążnia, Joniec, Naruszewo, Sochocin and Załuski.

References

Polish official population figures 2006

Plonsk
Płońsk County